Green Seamount is a small seamount (an underwater volcano) off the western coast of Mexico. It and the nearby Red Seamount were visited in 1982 by an expedition using DSV Alvin, which observed the seamount's sedimentary composition, sulfur chimneys, and biology. Thus, Green Seamount is well-characterized for such a small feature.

Geology 
Non-hydrothermal sediments on the volcano were observed to be light, "cream-colored" carbonates thinly masked in a finer gray and green sediment.

The expedition also noted sulfur mounds near the caldera and pit crater walls; these are unusual because, unlike most mid-ocean ridge seamounts, Green's "sulfur chimneys" contain a high amount of silicon, iron, copper, and quartz, but are poor in zinc. The complicated process that created the vents occurred between 140,000 and 70,000 years ago, and by looking at the sulfur chimneys scientists can estimate that it has taken about 260,000 years for the Green Seamount to reach its present height. There is also an iron-manganese crust on a small off-axis seamount that adjoins Green Seamount, a configuration common with sulfur-rich seamounts.

Biology 
Green Seamount is not very biologically diverse. The only fauna observed at its hydrothermal sites were single-celled, fan-shaped xenophyophores, and some shrimp. The xenophyophores in particular were of a type that was found on many of the seamounts in the eastern Pacific region. Alvin took two samples, a sponge of the Hexactinellid family and barnacles of the Sessilia order, back to the surface for analysis.

References 

Seamounts of the Pacific Ocean
Volcanoes of Mexico
Pleistocene volcanoes